Christian Friedrich Kayssler, commonly spelled Kayßler (14 June 1898 – 10 March 1944), was a German stage and film actor. He was the son of the actor Friedrich Kayßler. He appeared in 14 films before dying in an Allied bombing raid on Berlin in March 1944 during World War II. He played one of the major roles in the 1939 aviation film D III 88.

Filmography

References

External links 
 

1898 births
1944 deaths
German male film actors
Actors from Wrocław
20th-century German male actors
German civilians killed in World War II
Deaths by airstrike during World War II